Slupčane is the largest village in the municipality of Lipkovo, North Macedonia.

History
Descendants of the Krasniqi fis were recorded in the villages of Gošince, Slupčane, Alaševce and Runica in 1965.

Demographics
As of the 2021 census, Slupčane had 3,654 residents with the following ethnic composition:
Albanians 3,574
Persons for whom data are taken from administrative sources 79
Others 1

According to the 2002 census, the village had a total of 3789 inhabitants.  Ethnic groups in the village include:

Albanians: 3765
Macedonians: 4
Vlachs: 1
Others: 19

Sports
The local football club KF Besa Sllupçan plays in the Macedonian Third Football League.

References

External links

Villages in Lipkovo Municipality
Albanian communities in North Macedonia